Robin Paul Corley is an American behavior geneticist and senior research associate at the Institute for Behavioral Genetics at the University of Colorado Boulder.

References

External links
Faculty page

Living people
University of Colorado Boulder faculty
University of Colorado Boulder alumni
Behavior geneticists
21st-century American psychologists
American geneticists
Year of birth missing (living people)